Anthony Shim is a Canadian actor and filmmaker based in Vancouver, British Columbia.

Born in Seoul, South Korea, he moved with his family to the Vancouver suburb of Coquitlam in childhood. He has had acting roles in both film and television, including in the 2013 film Evangeline and recurring supporting roles in the television series The Guard and 21 Thunder.

His full-length feature debut as a director, Daughter, premiered at the 2019 Vancouver International Film Festival. His second feature film, Riceboy Sleeps, premiered in the Platform Prize competition at the 2022 Toronto International Film Festival, and was named the winner of the Platform Prize.

References

External links

21st-century Canadian male actors
21st-century Canadian male writers
21st-century Canadian screenwriters
Living people
Canadian male film actors
Canadian male television actors
Canadian male screenwriters
Canadian male actors of Korean descent
Canadian writers of Asian descent
Film directors from British Columbia
Male actors from British Columbia
Male actors from Seoul
People from Coquitlam
South Korean emigrants to Canada
Writers from British Columbia
Year of birth missing (living people)
Asian-Canadian filmmakers